Samuel Shore ("Hamby" Shore) was a Canadian ice hockey player.

Samuel Shore may also refer to:

Samuel Shore (banker) (1738–1828), High Sheriff of Derbyshire for 1761
Samuel Shore (of Norton Hall) (1761–1836), owner of Norton Hall, High Sheriff of Derbyshire for 1832
Samuel Shore, character in Stingray (TV series)
Sammy Shore, founder of The Comedy Store

See also
Samuel Shaw (disambiguation)
Sam Shore (disambiguation)